Nightclub Hostess (French title: L'Entraîneuse) is a 1940 French language motion picture drama  directed by Albert Valentin. The screenplay was written by Charles Spaak. The film stars Michèle Morgan, Gilbert Gil, Gisèle Préville, Jeanne Lion and Fréhel.

It tells the story of a hostess/call-girl who falls in love with a rich friend, whose father had tried to pick her up at the club.

Cast
Michèle Morgan as  Suzy 
Gilbert Gil as  Pierre Noblet 
Andrex as  Marcel 
Gisèle Préville as  Lucienne Noblet 
Arthur Devère as  Raymond, le domestique 
Georges Lannes as  Philippe de Lormel 
Catherine Fonteney as  Madame de Saint-Leu 
Jeanne Lion as  Tante Louise 
René Génin as  Le vieux professeur 
François Périer as  Jean 
Jimmy Gaillard as  André 
Monique Joyce as  Florence 
Fréhel as  La chanteuse 
Félicien Tramel as  Monsieur Noblet

References

External links

L'Entraîneuse at DvdToile

1940 films
1940 drama films
French drama films
Films set in Paris
1940s French-language films
French black-and-white films
UFA GmbH films
1940s French films